"The Unlucky Winner Is..." is an episode of the BBC sitcom, Only Fools and Horses. It was the fourth episode of series 6 and was first screened on 29 January 1989. In the episode, Rodney wins a holiday to Majorca, Spain, the only catch is the organisers think he is fourteen.

Synopsis
Del Boy has become obsessed with entering competitions, and enters a painting produced by Rodney when he was fourteen into one, though without Rodney's consent. Rodney's work is selected as one of the winners, and his prize is a free holiday to Majorca, Spain, but when informing him of his success, Del declines to tell Rodney that he has won in the under-15 category. When at the airport, Del finally tells Rodney and Cassandra the full details of the prize, namely that the organisers think Rodney is fourteen. He persuades the two to go along with it, meaning that Rodney has to pretend to be fourteen for the week, with Del posing as his father and Cassandra posing as his stepmother.

The plot appears to work, despite bemused looks from the organisers, especially after it emerges that Del has altered the birth date on Rodney's passport. However it turns out that the organisers, in order to allow the parents of all the children present (also competition winners) a chance to enjoy the holiday as well, have set up a club filled with activities for the youngsters to enjoy. As a result, Rodney is forced into the Groovy Gang, a youth activity group, and is made to undergo a week of embarrassment as he is takes part in a variety of children's activities, such as skateboarding, in which Rodney comes second in a contest, and attending a junior disco, where Rodney advanced to the final of the breakdancing contest. Rodney is also the crush of a thirteen-year-old Bros fan. Both Rodney and Cassandra are soon despondent, since they cannot spend any time together, and are ready to reveal the truth, but Del, who is enjoying himself, pretends to each of them (separately) that the other is having fun.

Whilst on the trip, Del purchases some Spanish lottery tickets for each of them – to placate Cassandra and Rodney's anger at being lied to –  and Rodney's numbers win the one million peseta jackpot. The group are then informed by the holiday organisers that they will be unable to claim the prize, since the winning tickets were in Rodney's name and under Spanish law, people under eighteen are not allowed to gamble. Knowing their act is over and desperately wanting to claim the prize, Rodney produces his student card to prove he is really over eighteen, so the Trotters can then legally claim the prize. However, that has also been changed by Del, meaning the Trotters' money cannot be claimed. Del defeatedly suggests "It's only money, bruv..." to cheer Rodney up. Rodney angrily chases Del out of the bar as the credits roll.

Episode cast

Story arc
This episode features the first mention of Elsie Partridge, which foreshadows her appearance in the next episode, "Sickness and Wealth", and the events of this episode are mentioned in "The Jolly Boys' Outing", "Time on Our Hands", and the Sport Relief 2014 Special. These episodes are what Rodney recalls when Del has mistreated him (and Cassandra in 'The Jolly Boys' Outing' because she is involved in this too).

Music
 Alison Moyet: "That Ole Devil Called Love"
 Buckwheat Zydeco: "Why Does Love Got to Be So Sad?"
 Love And Money: "Strange Kind of Love"
 Holly Johnson: "Love Train"
 Habit: "Lucy"
 Rick Astley: "Hold Me in Your Arms"
 The Tweets: "Birdie Song"
 Sylvia Vrethammar: "Y Viva España"

External links

 
 

1989 British television episodes
Mallorca in fiction
Only Fools and Horses (series 6) episodes
Television episodes about vacationing